Gerhard "Gerry" Friedle (born 7 January 1971), better known by his stage name DJ Ötzi, is an Austrian pop and Schlager singer. Successful mainly in German-speaking countries, he is best known in the English-speaking world for his 2000 single "Hey Baby (Uhh, Ahh)", a cover version of the Bruce Channel song "Hey! Baby". His stage name comes from Ötzi the Iceman, the name given to the 5,300-year-old frozen remains of a mummified man discovered in 1991 in South Tyrol's Ötztal Alps.

Biography

Early life
Ötzi was born Gerhard Friedle in St. Johann, Tirol, the son of Anton Friedle. Shortly after birth, his mother, aged 17 at the time, gave him up for adoption. He was raised by foster parents and later by his paternal grandparents in the nearby village of Erpfendorf in Tirol. At a young age, Ötzi suffered from epilepsy. At age 16, he was homeless and lived on the streets for a short time. His career arose gradually, first working as a student cook, then on being discovered at a karaoke competition, went on to work as an entertainer (animateur), DJ and singer in discothèques around Austria, as well as in tourist destinations Mallorca and Turkey. In 2002, before the birth of his daughter, Ötzi suffered a severe form of conductive hearing loss.

Musical career

Debut album and early success
In 1999, DJ Ötzi released the single "Anton aus Tirol". The song was a massive hit in German-speaking countries, reaching number one in Austria and Germany, while it peaked at number two in Belgium, the Netherlands, and Switzerland. The song spent 75 weeks in the Austrian charts and was number-one for ten weeks. The success of the single propelled the release of the Anton (feat. DJ Ötzi) album Das Album in 2000.

Second album and international recognition
In July 2000, Ötzi released a cover version of Bruce Channel's 1962 song "Hey Baby". This single reached number-one in several English-speaking countries, including Australia, Ireland and the United Kingdom. He followed up this release with a cover version of "Do Wah Diddy".

Continued success

In 2003, Ötzi released a cover version of "A Ram Sam Sam", called the "Burger Dance", which reached number-one in Germany, number 3 in Austria, and number 7 in Switzerland.

In 2006, he found success with the Volksmusik hit "Sieben Sünden", which became a number 2 hit in Austria and "I Am the Music Man" under the pseudonym DJ Ötzi Junior, which reached number-one in Japan.

In 2007, he released "Ein Stern (...der deinen Namen trägt)" with Austrian Schlager singer Nik P. It reached number one in (Germany) where it stayed for 13 weeks and Austria, number 2 in Switzerland, and number 5 in the European Union, despite the fact that at the time of its release, some of the most popular radio stations in Austria and Germany declined to play the song because its genre did not fit their programme style. The single has sold more than 2 million copies. Spending 106 weeks on the German Singles Chart, it is the first song to be on that chart for two years or longer, and the longest running song ever on that chart.

Discography

Albums

Singles

References

External links

 DJ Ötzi's official homepage (in German) at Universal Music GmbH

1971 births
Living people
Austrian DJs
Club DJs
People from Tyrol (state)
Eurodance musicians
English-language singers from Austria
Schlager musicians
Electronic dance music DJs
21st-century Austrian  male singers
EMI Records artists